The Eastern Liberal Party (Tōyō Jiyūtō) was a political party in Japan.

History
The Eastern Liberal Party was established by Ōi Kentarō in 1891 as a breakaway from the Liberal Party after a dispute between Ōi and Hoshi Tōru; it initially had four members of the Diet. Whilst adopting a hawkish foreign policy and calling for an increase in military spending, the party also supported widening the electoral franchise and protecting workers' rights.

The party was dissolved in November 1893.

References

Defunct political parties in Japan
Political parties established in 1891
1891 establishments in Japan
Political parties disestablished in 1893
1893 disestablishments in Japan